Brachyglottis repanda, the rangiora or bushman's friend, is a small, bushy tree or tall shrub endemic to New Zealand. It grows to a height of 5 to 7 meters. The petioles of the leaves have a characteristic groove up to 10 cm long. The large leaves with a soft furry underside have been referred to as "bushman's toilet paper".

Description 
Rangiora is a shrub / small tree which grows to around 6 m (19.7 ft.) tall and has corky bark. It has leathery 5–25 cm long, 5–20 cm wide leaves suspended off of 8–10 cm grooved petioles. The leaves are a pale green above and white underneath as the underside is covered with many tiny white hairs. It flowers from August to October with dramatic panicle inflorescences made of 6 ribs and 3mm long involucral bracts. Pseudanthium are 5mm in diameter and the inflorescences contain 10–12 yellow florets. The seeds are oblong and 1–1.8 mm long, with 2–3 mm rough yellow pappus. It fruits from November to December and disperses its seeds via the wind.

Etymology 
Brachyglottis comes from the two greek words: Brachus, meaning short, and glottis which is the vocal apparatus of the larynx. Repanda means irregularly undulating, referring to the leaf margins.

Cultivation 
Rangiora is easy to grow either from seed or from cuttings, though may be short-lived and requires a hard prune after flowering.

In Māori culture 
Māori used the plant for a number of medicinal uses. Rangiora leaves were used for wounds and old ulcerated sores, and the gum was chewed for foul breath but was poisonous if swallowed. The ethnographer Richard Taylor recorded that the leaves were used to wrap cakes made from hīnau berry meal while they cooked in a hāngi. They were also used, he claimed, to line the baskets which held the siftings of raupō pollen in the process of making bread (from the pollen), the siftings then being thrown out.

Toxins 
The botanist and chemist Bernard Aston reported that the honey made by bees produced with the nectar from rangiora is  poisonous, and for this reason Māori never collected honey when it was in flower. The plant is also apparently poisonous to livestock, particularly horses, making them "drunk." The animals stagger around and fall, often to their death, as a result.

References

External links

Trees of New Zealand
repanda
Endemic flora of New Zealand